Intertelecom is the largest CDMA mobile operator in Ukraine, providing voice and data services based on a CDMA2000 technologies in the 800 MHz frequency band.

By 2012 Intertelecom subscriber base reached 1 million active users.

Intertelecom uses local network codes for dialing prefixes as well as the national code +38094.

Mobile internet 

By mid-2010 Intertelecom launched CDMA2000 1xEV-DO Rev A network in 24 regions of Ukraine and by 2011 upgraded the network to Rev B. By 2013 Rev B covered more than 71% of the population.

Coverage 

By the year 2012, Intertelecom acquired all existing IS-95 and CDMA2000 1xRTT carriers in Ukraine (except PEOPLEnet) such as its rival CDMA UA,
 thus expanding its coverage area to the entire Ukrainian territory.

On July 1, 2021, voice service coverage in the majority of regions (except for Odessa and Odessa region) got cancelled

References

External links
 Official website (in Ukrainian)

Mobile phone companies of Ukraine
Telecommunications companies of Ukraine